Ringer is an American thriller crime drama television series that initially aired on The CW from September 13, 2011 to April 17, 2012. The series stars Sarah Michelle Gellar, who plays twin sisters Bridget Kelly and Siobhan Martin. On May 13, 2011, it was reported that the project had been picked up to series by The CW. On October 12, 2011, The CW ordered a full first season of 22 episodes.

Ringer received mixed reviews, though most critics praised Gellar's performance. On May 11, 2012, The CW canceled the series after one season.

Series synopsis
Bridget Kelly (Sarah Michelle Gellar) is a recovering drug addict and stripper in Wyoming. She is under the protection of FBI Agent Victor Machado (Nestor Carbonell), having agreed to testify against her employer, local crime boss Bodaway Macawi (Zahn McClarnon), whom she witnessed committing murder. Fearing that Macawi, who has already murdered several witnesses linking him to previous crimes, will also kill her, Bridget flees to New York to meet her estranged twin sister Siobhan (also played by Gellar).

Soon after Bridget's arrival in New York, Siobhan, who had kept her sister's existence secret from her family, appears to commit suicide by jumping into the ocean. Bridget then assumes Siobhan's identity and tries to fit in among Siobhan's wealthy social circle, including Siobhan's husband Andrew (Ioan Gruffudd), stepdaughter Juliet (Zoey Deutch), best friend Gemma (Tara Summers), and Gemma's husband Henry (Kristoffer Polaha) with whom Siobhan had been having an affair. The only one who knows that Bridget is passing as Siobhan is Bridget's Narcotics Anonymous sponsor Malcolm (Mike Colter). Bridget's life becomes more complicated as she discovers that her sister was hiding secrets of her own and that someone is trying to kill Siobhan as well.

Cast and characters

Main
 Sarah Michelle Gellar as Bridget Kelly and Siobhan Martin. Bridget, a troubled young woman who goes on the run, after she is wanted dead by the mob, to her twin sister, Siobhan for help. Siobhan appears to commit suicide by jumping into the ocean soon after Bridget's arrival in New York. Bridget assumes her identity only to learn that Siobhan had secrets of her own.
 Kristoffer Polaha as Henry Butler, Gemma's husband, a writer unhappy with his life and had an affair with Siobhan.
 Ioan Gruffudd as Andrew Martin, a self-made millionaire whose marriage to Siobhan is struggling as he deals with his work and keeping his daughter out of trouble.
 Nestor Carbonell as Victor Machado, an FBI agent whose job is to keep Bridget safe.
 Mike Colter as Malcolm Ward, a recovering addict who serves as Bridget's Narcotics Anonymous sponsor. He knows about Bridget's double life.

Recurring
 Zoey Deutch as Juliet Martin, Siobhan's 17-year-old step-daughter
 Tara Summers as Gemma Butler, Siobhan's best friend
 Zahn McClarnon as Bodaway Macawi, the mob boss who's after Bridget
 Darren Pettie as Detective Jimmy Kemper, Machado's partner in Wyoming
 Jaime Murray as Olivia Charles, Andrew's business partner. It is revealed that Olivia is involved in a relationship with Catherine.
 Justin Bruening as Tyler Barrett, a man who sets his sights on Siobhan
 Billy Miller as John Delario, who is working for Siobhan and meets Bridget during her NA meetings under the Alias Charlie Young. He kidnaps and murders Gemma and while he tries to hide the body, Siobhan kills him.
 Jason Dohring as Mr. Carpenter, a teacher at Juliet's high school
 Gage Golightly as Tessa Banner, Juliet's frenemy
 Andrea Roth as Catherine Martin, Andrew's ex-wife and Juliet's mother. It is revealed that Catherine is involved in a relationship with Olivia.
 Gregory Harrison as Tim Arbogast, Gemma's wealthy father
 Sean Patrick Thomas as Solomon Vessida, Bridget's bodyguard
 Jordan Marder as Rex Barton, a hitman hired by Catherine

Notable Guest Stars
 Nicole Gale Anderson as Monica Reynolds, Juliet's friend
 Amber Benson as Mary Curtis
 Mädchen Amick as Greer Sheridan, a friend of Siobhan
 Misha Collins as Dylan Morrison, the father of Siobhan's deceased son
 Nikki DeLoach as Shaylene Briggs, a stripper who was Bridget's co-worker and Machado's informant/girlfriend
 Matthew Del Negro as Grady Torrance, Machado's superior
 Jonathan Banks as Remy Osterman, dangerous criminal
 Dylan Neal as Washburn Milter

Development and production

The pilot was announced in early 2011 for CBS. Filming for the pilot began in March 2011 in New York City. The pilot was directed by Richard Shepard and written by Eric Charmelo and Nicole Snyder. The remainder of the series was entirely filmed in Los Angeles. Gellar served as executive producer alongside Peter Traugott and Pam Veasey.

In a surprise, the pilot was picked up to series on May 13, 2011 not by CBS, but by their sister network, The CW. This caused ABC Studios to drop out of co-producing the show, citing that it cannot produce a series for the economics of The CW. Warner Bros. Television stepped in as co-producers instead. On the CW's 2011-12 schedule the series was paired with 90210 and aired Tuesday nights at 9:00 pm Eastern/8:00 pm Central. The network initially ordered thirteen episodes.

The series premiered on September 13, 2011. On October 12, 2011, the series was picked up for a full season of 22 episodes.

Casting
Casting announcements for the series began in January 2011. First to be cast was Sarah Michelle Gellar, who also served as executive producer. Gellar plays Bridget and her twin sister Siobhan Martin. Gellar said, "The joke is that I'm playing five characters" – Bridget and Siobhan in the present, both women in flashbacks, and "Shivette" (which it says on her chair on set), Bridget impersonating Siobhan. The series was Gellar's return to television following the end of Buffy the Vampire Slayer eight years earlier.

Next to be cast was Nestor Carbonell as Victor Machado, followed by Ioan Gruffudd as Siobhan's husband Andrew Martin, and Mike Colter as Bridget's sponsor Malcolm Ward. Tara Summers later joined the series as Gemma Butler. Kristoffer Polaha was the last actor to be cast in March 2011, as Henry Butler.

It was reported on July 19, 2011, that Jaime Murray had been cast as Olivia, Andrew's business partner, who first appeared in episode two and became a recurring character.  On July 26, 2011, it was announced that Zoey Deutch had been recast as Juliet, Siobhan's step-daughter and Andrew's daughter. In August, several other recurring roles were cast.

Justin Bruening would be joining Ringer as a recurring character named Tyler, who will pursue Siobhan; Billy Miller as John Delario, who met Bridget during her NA meetings; Jason Dohring as Mr. Carpenter, a teacher at the high school Siobhan's step-daughter Juliet attends; and Gage Golightly was cast in a recurring role as Tessa, "a tough teenager who tangles with Siobhan's step-daughter Juliet (Zoey Deutch) at her new inner-city school". On September 3, Nicole Gale Anderson revealed on her official Twitter that she joined Ringer and will play the role of Monica. Mädchen Amick has been cast as Greer Sheridan, Siobhan's old friend. On October 26, it was announced that Andrea Roth has been cast to play Catherine, Andrew's ex-wife and Juliet's mother. Brody Hutzler was cast as Greer Sheridan's husband Jason.

Music 
The show mostly broadcasts indie music. During the Pilot, in order to accentuate the neo-noir aspect of the show, the 1960 song "I Fall to Pieces" by Patsy Cline and a cover of the 1969 song "25 or 6 to 4" by Pacifika were played during key scenes. Later in the season, along with "Glory Box" by Portishead, "Video Games" was featured for the first time on prime spot on Ringer on September 28, 2011 during a pivotal scene. Adele's song "Set Fire To The Rain" was used for the promotional campaign of the show and "Rumour Has It" during the last scene of the mid-season finale. The song "Riverside" by the Alfred Hitchcock lover, Agnes Obel is played during Episode 12 and another Lana Del Rey song, "Blue Jeans", was played on February 14, 2012 during the last scene of the episode. The new Regina Spektor single, "All the Rowboats", was featured on Episode 17. Season one ended with a song from the rock band The Black Keys called "She's Long Gone".

The main title music was composed by Gabriel Mann, who also scored the pilot and the first four episodes; Mark Snow assumed scoring duties thereafter.

Episodes

Promotion 
Sarah Michelle Gellar, Ioan Gruffudd and Kristoffer Polaha were at the 1st Critics' Choice Television Awards on June 20, 2011 at the Beverly Hills Hotel to support Ringer and receive "The Most Exciting New Series" award.

The series made its debut at Comic-Con 2011 with cast members Sarah Michelle Gellar, Nestor Carbonell, Ioan Gruffudd and Kristoffer Polaha.  Executive producer Pam Veasey and co-executive producers Nicole Snyder and Eric Charmelo also appeared. In addition, Gellar was featured in a photo shoot for The Hollywood Reporter entitled Comic-Con: TV's 6 Most Wanted Women.

Two promotional posters for the series were unveiled on July 20, 2011; one with Gellar, Carbonell, Gruffudd and Polaha, and one with only Gellar, both with the tagline "The Ultimate Double Cross". Sarah Michelle Gellar, Nestor Carbonell, Ioan Gruffudd, Kristoffer Polaha and Mike Colter attended "The Television Critics Association Summer Tour" to promote Ringer. Throughout August several Ringer billboards were displayed in Los Angeles, New York and Chicago and two huge mirrors were launched in New York and Los Angeles to allow passersby to create visual doppelgangers of themselves.

On September 1, 2011, a new promotional poster was released with the whole cast. Sarah Michelle Gellar was featured on the cover of the September 2, 2011 Entertainment Weekly with the tagline "The Return (Yay!) of Sarah Michelle Gellar. One of TV's most iconic stars is back with a twisty new drama, Ringer: 'It's what audiences want to see me do – It's Cruel Intentions meets Buffy". On September 7, 2011, Eric Charmelo, Nicole Snyder, Mike Colter, and Nestor Carbonell were at the Paley Fest 2011: Fall TV Preview Parties in Los Angeles to preview the pilot following an introductory Panel. On September 10, 2011 the whole cast (except Gellar) was at the CW Launch Party. On September 11, 2011, Sarah Michelle Gellar made the cover of The New York VUE, the TV magazine included every Sunday in The Daily News with the tagline "Doubling Back. Sarah Michelle Gellar returns to TV playing twins on Ringer". On September 12, 2011, Sarah Michelle Gellar was on Late Night with Jimmy Fallon and on Regis and Kelly the following day to promote the pilot. On September 26, 2011, Gellar was a guest on Chelsea Lately to promote the series and on Rachael Ray the following day. On October 13, 2011, Gellar was a guest on the late-night talk show Conan and on Jimmy Kimmel Live! on November 14, 2011. On February 6, 2012, Gellar was a guest on Andy Cohen's "Watch What Happens Live" with Ryan Murphy and on the Late Show with David Letterman. The following day she was on the morning show Live! with Kelly and on February 21, 2012 on Rachael Ray.

Reception

 Critical reception 
The pilot was met with mixed to positive reviews, dividing critics, with an initial score of 59 out of 100 (based on 29 critics) from Metacritic.

In a review at TV.com, Tim Surette was enthusiastic about the show's pilot, deeming it over-the-top with its "convoluted mystery" and "Outrageous. But potentially delicious fun." After Elton also gave Ringer a positive review, calling it  "the single best new show of the year". People Magazine gave the series 4/4 stars. E! News called the show "intense", commending the "film noir-ness" of the show. They described Sarah Michelle Gellar as "awesome" and "fantastic". Their verdict was "watch, watch, watch!" The Insider included Ringer in its list of "10 Best New Fall TV Shows". Matt Mitovich of TV Line gave the pilot a positive review stating, "the set-up is sound, with some loose ends addressed and nice details sprinkled in. Tackling multiple roles, Gellar does a fine job as in-too-deep Bridget, icy Siobhan, and Bridget-as-Siobhan, and the supporting cast presents no weak link." Ringer was one of the Editor's Picks of Yahoo! saying "the first episode delivers so many shocking twists and turns, you won't be able to catch your breath. Heck, we're still catching ours." The New York Post gave a positive review giving 3/4 stars saying the pilot is "so good that it's CBS' bad" for having given away Ringer to the CW. USA Today gave 3/4 stars thanks to "two very good, well-defined Gellar performances" their bottom line was "you've been given a good show, CW. Don't mess it up."

Las Vegas Weekly gave a mixed review, saying it was "a little silly but also juicy and well-acted". The Hollywood Reporter concluded that although Gellar was "projecting gravitas" the show "really doesn't have a lot of weight". Newsday likewise commented that while Sarah Michelle Gellar looks "stunning", the show doesn't fit the network as "it's inert, lackluster and a trifle old-fashioned", and gave it a C+ grade. Matthew Gilbert of 'The Boston Globe was more negative about Ringer, handing it a "D" grade as well as calling the special effects "lousy" and "sloppy", and "the story line – ripped from a cheesy daytime soap".

Ratings
The pilot episode drew 2.84 million viewers, a 1.2 Adults 18-49 demo rating and a 1.6 in The CW's target demo of Women 18-34. The ratings reached a three-year high for The CW in the Tuesday 9:00pm time slot. The Friday after its debut, The CW broadcast an encore of the pilot episode which drew 1.87 million viewers and a 0.6 Adults 18-49 rating. The mid-season finale drew 1.6 million viewers and a 0.6 Adults 18-49 rating, with DVR figures increasing its 0.6 A18-49 rating by 67% elevating it to 1.0 A18-49 rating.

Cancellation and aftermath

After a decline in ratings and viewership from the three-month hiatus over the holiday break, it was deemed that Ringer would likely be cancelled.  The CW put the Canadian series The L.A. Complex in its time slot after the finale, in hopes that show would produce higher ratings. Ringer was nominated in the E! Save One Show campaign and came in third place.  Multiple petitions were thus created, with one that had over 16,000 signatures.  After about a month of the show's uncertainty,  the CW officially cancelled the series on May 11, 2012.

The show was subsequently nominated for four more awards, including a Teen Choice award for Choice TV Actress in a Drama for Sarah Michelle Gellar, a Zap2it award, and two E! Online awards.  The show has now been nominated for sixteen awards, thus quadruple the other freshman shows on the CW; and recently the show became the third-highest-selling TV show on iTunes amongst all CW shows.  On May 24, 2012, it was officially revealed that Ringer was the CW's fifth-highest-rated series, with its viewership ratings and demographics beating out the network's renewed series, from fellow programs Nikita, America's Next Top Model, and Gossip Girl in overall viewership.

In January 2023, Gellar revealed that the show ended because she felt that she could not complete another season when she discovered she was pregnant with her second child. Gellar believed that the CW would have picked up the show for another season if she continued.

Awards and accolades

International broadcasts

Sky Living has picked up the series in the UK, Louisa Forsyth, acquisitions manager at BSkyB said of the pick-up, "Securing Ringer exclusively for Sky Living demonstrates yet again our commitment to owning the very best in primetime US drama". The first season will start airing from September 29, 2011.  In Canada, it will air on Global Television Network starting September 16, 2011. On July 28, 2011, it was announced that Mediaset España Comunicación has bought the rights to air Ringer in Spain, and it aired on April 15, 2012 on Telecinco. On August 25, 2011, Television Business International announced that the French Group M6 has renewed its output deal with CBS, which includes Ringer. In Australia Ringer also aired on Network Ten on October 9, 2011, but has since been dropped and moved to its sister channel, Eleven on February 20, and airs Monday Nights at 10:30pm as of the March 12, 2012. Studio Universal bought the exclusive rights for Latin America (Brazil, Argentina, Colombia, Mexico, Peru, Uruguay, Venezuela, and Chile among others) and RAI bought the rights for Italy to broadcast Ringer on channel Rai 2 in 2012. DSTV has started to broadcast Ringer in South Africa on M-Net Series. The series has been shown in Portugal since October 2011 on pay-TV channel TV Séries under title name 'Vida Dupla' (Double Life)  and is available on video on demand in Sweden since March 1, 2012 on TV4 Play. Ringer will air in 18 countries in Asia through AXN Beyond starting March 15, 2012  and in India on Big CBS Love starting April 2, 2012. In the middle east, Ringer was picked by MBC4, airing with Arabic subtitles. In Israel, the series is broadcast by Hot 3 starting September 28, 2012. In the Netherlands, the series is broadcast by Net5 starting September 4, 2012.

See also
 The Lying Game

References

External links

 

2010s American crime drama television series
2010s American LGBT-related drama television series
2010s American mystery television series
2011 American television series debuts
2012 American television series endings
American thriller television series
Crime thriller television series
The CW original programming
English-language television shows
Identity theft in popular culture
Neo-noir television series
Television series about sisters
Television series about twins
Television series by ABC Studios
Television series by CBS Studios
Television series by Warner Bros. Television Studios
Television shows filmed in Los Angeles
Television shows filmed in New York (state)
Television shows set in New York City
Works about twin sisters